Mugdab is a rural locality (a selo) in Tlogobsky Selsoviet, Gunibsky District, Republic of Dagestan, Russia. The population was 117 as of 2010.

Geography 
Mugdab is located 43 km northwest of Gunib (the district's administrative centre) by road, on the Kunada River. Gazilala and Tloglob are the nearest rural localities.

Nationalities 
Avars live there.

References 

Rural localities in Gunibsky District